Tell Hazzine is an archaeological site 11 km south southwest of Baalbek in the Beqaa Mohafazat (Governorate). It dates at least to the Early Bronze Age.

References

Baalbek District
Bronze Age sites in Lebanon